Manipur Police Sports Club is an Indian institutional football club based in Manipur. Their men's team plays in the Manipur State League, while their women's team plays in the Manipur Women's League. The club also played in the Indian Women's League.

Women's team

Club officials

2019 players

Honours

Men's team
 Thangjam Birchandra-Maipakpi Memorial Winners' Cup
 Champions (1): 2019
 S Birendra Singh Memorial Super Division Football League (Imphal West)
 Champions (1): 2019
 Mayanglambam Chittamani Memorial Winners Cup
 Champions (2): 2002, 2004

Women's team
 Indian Women's League
 Runners-up (1): 2018–19
 Manipur Women's League
 Champions (3): 2012, 2013, 2018

References

External links 
Achievements of Manipur Police Sports Club at manipurpolice.gov.in

Football clubs in Manipur
Police association football clubs in India
Indian Women's League clubs
Women's football clubs in India
Organizations with year of establishment missing